Punjung is a traditional dessert for the Bruneian Malay people and Kedayan in Labuan and in the states of Sabah, Malaysia.

References 

Bruneian cuisine
Malaysian cuisine